Burst of Youth for the Nation (PSJN), commonly referred to as Sursaut, is a political party in Mauritania led by Lalla Cheriva.

History
The party won four seats in the 2013 parliamentary elections.

References

Political parties in Mauritania